The 2010 Korean Tour was a season on the Korean Tour, a series of professional golf tournaments. The table below shows the season results.

Schedule
The following table lists official events during the 2010 season.

Order of Merit
The Order of Merit was based on prize money won during the season, calculated using a points-based system.

Notes

References

External links
Results on the Korean Tour's official site

2010 Korean Tour
2010 in golf
2010 in South Korean sport